Hajji Hasan-e Khaleseh (also Romanized as Ḩājjī Ḩasan-e Khāleşeh; also known as Ḩājj Ḩasan-e Khāleşeh) is a village in Zarrineh Rud Rural District, in the Central District of Miandoab County, West Azerbaijan Province, Iran. At the 2006 census, its population was 571, in 105 families.

References 

Populated places in Miandoab County